Zsolt Szadovszki (born 1974) is a Hungarian sprint canoer who competed in the late 1990s. He won two silver medals at the 1998 ICF Canoe Sprint World Championships in Szeged, earning them in the K-4 500 m and K-4 1000 m events.

References

Hungarian male canoeists
Living people
ICF Canoe Sprint World Championships medalists in kayak
1974 births
20th-century Hungarian people